Amanullinic acid is a cyclic nonribosomal peptide. It is an amatoxin, all of which are found in several members of the mushroom genus Amanita. Amanullinic acid is relatively non-toxic( oral  >20 mg/kg in mice).

Toxicology

Like other amatoxins, amanullinic acid is an inhibitor of RNA polymerase II.

See also
Mushroom poisoning

References

External links
Amatoxins REVISED 

Peptides
Amatoxins
Hepatotoxins